Issa Ndoye (born 12 December 1985) is a Senegalese professional football goalkeeper who plays for Mulhouse.

Club career
Ndoye signed for Isfahan side Zob Ahan in 2005. After Iranian football league imposed foreign goalkeepers ban he moved to Ukraine. He was linked with Metalist Kharkiv first and had a short trial there, but then signed two-year contract with Volyn Lutsk. He joined Tractor Sazi in December 2014.

International career
Ndoye has previously played for Under-16, Under-17 and Under-21 Senegal National Teams.

Ndoye was announced as a part of the 38-man squad of the Senegal national football team in preparation for the 2008 African Cup of Nations, however he was not selected for the tournament with Bouna Coundoul being favoured to Ndoye.

Career statistics

References

External links
 Ndoye Interview
 
 

1985 births
Living people
People from Thiès Region
Sportspeople from Thiès
Senegalese footballers
Association football goalkeepers
Senegal international footballers
Senegalese expatriate footballers
Expatriate footballers in Belarus
Expatriate footballers in Ukraine
Expatriate footballers in Iran
Expatriate footballers in Germany
Expatriate footballers in France
Senegalese expatriate sportspeople in Ukraine
Senegalese expatriate sportspeople in Iran
Senegalese expatriate sportspeople in Germany
Senegalese expatriate sportspeople in France
Senegalese expatriate sportspeople in Belarus
Ukrainian Premier League players
Ligue 2 players
ASC Jeanne d'Arc players
Zob Ahan Esfahan F.C. players
FC Volyn Lutsk players
SpVgg Greuther Fürth players
US Créteil-Lusitanos players
Tractor S.C. players
FC Slavia Mozyr players
FC Mulhouse players